The Sinceros were a new wave and power pop band from London, England, who recorded two albums for Epic Records, The Sound of Sunbathing (1979) and Pet Rock (1981). Both albums were released worldwide and achieved moderate commercial success.

Career
Mark Kjeldsen, Bobby Irwin and Ron François first played together in a London R&B band called The Strutters.

The Sinceros were primarily a vehicle for Kjeldsen's composing talents. He sang lead vocals on most of the band's material although François contributed more songs on their later albums.

Prior to signing their Epic Records recording contract, the rhythm section, Irwin and François, participated in the recording of Stiff Records' recording artist Lene Lovich's Stateless album. Don Snow joined them in support of the record on the 1978 "Be Stiff" Tour.

Their first album, The Sound of Sunbathing, was produced by Joe Wissert and recorded at Wessex Studios in London. The band achieved considerable radio play with its first single, "Take Me to Your Leader". They toured extensively after the release of the album, riding on the heels of the then thriving new wave music scene, though not as extensively as was originally planned due to band management and record company squabbles over financing. Undeterred, the band continued to accept studio session work with other artists, with Irwin and Snow particularly in demand.

An attempt at a follow-up album entitled, 2nd Debut, produced by Paul Riley was shelved by Epic Records and was essentially reworked into Pet Rock, under the guidance of producer Gus Dudgeon.

Several FM radio recordings of the band circulate, notably one from 13 December 1979 at The Palladium in New York City, that was broadcast by WNEW-FM. Dubbed the "$5 Rock and Roll Show", the bill also featured Bruce Woolley, Paul Collins' Beat and 20/20 and was attended by Mick Jagger. The band also made appearances at Hurrah in New York. Kjeldsen wears a T-shirt featuring this club's logo on the Pet Rock album cover.

The Sinceros disbanded in 1981. After their demise, Kjeldsen performed with the Danny Adler Band (ex-Roogalator). A live album featuring Kjeldsen on rhythm guitar was recorded at the Winterthur, Switzerland, on 10 August 1982 and released in 1983. In the 1990s, Kjeldsen became a social worker in London. He died of AIDS in 1992.

Snow joined Squeeze as a replacement for Paul Carrack. François joined The Teardrop Explodes and stayed with Epic Records releasing a solo single, "If You Love Me", in 1982 before departing to live in Australia where he has worked with local artists such as James Reyne, Wendy Matthews and The Eurogliders. Irwin resumed working with Nick Lowe before departing in 1985 to live and work in San Antonio, Texas. Since his return to the UK in 1992, he has worked with Nick Lowe and Van Morrison amongst others. Irwin died in 2015.

Reissues
The Sinceros' first album The Sound of Sunbathing has been made available on CD via Cherry Red Records with three bonus tracks which was released on 18 May 2009 with the catalogue number CDM RED 396. One track from this album had previously been available on CD, "Take Me to Your Leader", which was included on the compilation albums New Wave Hits of the 70's & 80's, Big Hits, Skinny Ties: New Wave in the UK and Reader's Digest Sounds of the Seventies 1979 Box Set. The three bonus tracks included of this CD are (track 11) "Are You Ready?", (12) "Up There" and (13) "Walls, Floors and Ceilings (Live)". More recently, their follow up album Pet Rock has also been made available on CD with many more bonus tracks. Pet Rock was released during 2010 on Wounded Bird / Sony with the catalogue number WOU 7349. Apart from the original 11 tracks featured on the vinyl version, tracks 12–21 make up what was to have been the subsequently shelved follow up to Sunbathing titled 2nd Debut, but this was never commercially available. This 'unreleased' album does however include duplicated songs as featured in the original Pet Rock album, but they are either alternate takes or alternate versions of the songs. Finally, four additional songs appear as bonus tracks, (22) "Torture Myself", (23) "Beady Eyes", (24) "Television Vision" and (25) an extended version of "Take Me to Your Leader" (the shorter version already being available on the Sunbathing album).

Discography

Albums
1979 – The Sound of Sunbathing
1980 – 2nd Debut
1981 – Pet Rock

Singles

Performances

Concerts: 1978
August
11 – Rochester Castle, Stoke Newington, London
13 – Golden Lion, Fulham, London
18 – Town Hall, High Wycombe (supporting The Rezillos)
September
01 – Metro Club, Plymouth
12 – Hope & Anchor, Islington, London
23 – Dingwalls, Camden Lock, London (supporting The News)
October
01 – The Roundhouse, Chalk Farm, London (Anti-Nazi Rally)
November
23 – Hope & Anchor, Islington, London
30 – Hope & Anchor, Islington, London
December
01 – Dingwalls, Camden Lock, London
07 – Hope & Anchor, Islington, London
13 – Chelsea Art College, London

Concerts: 1979
January
02 – The Nashville Rooms, West Kensington, London
22 – Hope & Anchor, Islington, London
26 – Dingwalls, Camden Lock, London
February
21 – Nelson's, Wimbledon F.C., London
28 – Dingwalls, Camden Lock, LondonMarch10 – Hope & Anchor, Islington, LondonMay01 – The Venue, Victoria, London (supporting Johnny Winter)
02 – Nelson's, Wimbledon F.C., London
03 – West Surrey College of Art
04 – The Venue, Victoria, London (supporting Johnny Winter)
05 – Portsmouth Polytechnic
06 – The Venue, Victoria, London (supporting Johnny Winter)
11 – Brunel University, Uxbridge (supporting Rachel Sweet)
12 – Essex University, Colchester (supporting Rachel Sweet)
14 – The Marquee, Soho, London
17 – Dingwalls, Camden Lock, London
21 – The Nashville Rooms, West Kensington, LondonJune04 – The Marquee, Soho, London
15 – Trent Polytechnic, Nottingham
16 – Froebel College, Twickenham
18 – The Marquee, Soho, London (recorded by the Stiff Mobile Studio)
22 – Weymouth
25 – Loughborough University, Nottingham
28 – University of Warwick, Warwick
29 – Radlett Wall Hall College, (supporting Chairmen of the Board)July02 – The Marquee, Soho, London
07 – Jacksdale Grey Topper, Nottingham
12 – The Fan Club, Leeds
13 – The Limit Club, Sheffield
14 – The Norbreck Hotel, Blackpool
15 – The Stagecoach, Dumfries
16 – Tiffany's, Edinburgh
19 – The Nashville Rooms, West Kensington, London
20 – The Sand Piper, Nottingham
21 – The Boogie House, Norwich
26 – The Nashville Rooms, West Kensington, London
27 – AJ's, Lincoln
28 – The Venue, Victoria, LondonAugust03 – JB's Dudley
04 – Hope & Anchor, Islington, London
05 – Hope & Anchor, Islington, London
25 – The Music Machine, LondonSeptember01 – Lees Cliff Hall, Folkestone
27 – Liverpool Polytechnic
28 – Southbank Polytechnic, LondonOctober01 – Queen Mary College, London
03 – Reading University, Reading
05 – King's College, London
06 – UMIST, Manchester
10 – Swansea University
11 – Dorset Institute of Higher Education, Town Hall, Bournemouth
12 – The Paradiso Club, Amsterdam (recorded and broadcast by VPRO Radio)
13 – The Exit Club, Rotterdam
18 – The Nashville Rooms, West Kensington, London
25 – Cornell University, New York, (with The Laughing Dogs)
26 – Buffalo University, (supporting Cock Robin)
28 – The Penny Arcade, Rochester, New York, (supporting Freeway)
31 – Worcester Polytechnic Institute, MassachusettsNovember01 – Stage West, Hartford, Connecticut
02 – Hurrah, New York City
03 – Hurrah, New York City
06 – The Jabberwocky Club, Syracuse University, New York
07 – Sir Morgan's Cove, Worcester, Massachusetts (broadcast live on WAAF Radio)
08 – Emerald City, Cherry Hill, New Jersey (supporting The A's)
09 – University of Massachusetts Amherst, Amherst, Massachusetts (supported by The Motels)
10 – Toad's, New Haven, Connecticut (supported by The Motels)
11 – Lupo's, Providence, Rhode Island (supported by The Motels)
13 – My Father's Place, Long Island, New York (broadcast live on WLIR Radio)
14 – The Fast Lane, Asbury Park, New Jersey (supported by The Motels)
15 – The Bayou Club, Washington D.C., (supported by [The Motels)
16 – Stars, Rats Keller, University of Connecticut, Connecticut
17 – The Rat, Boston, Massachusetts (supported by Live Wire)
18 – The Rat, Boston, Massachusetts (supported by Live Wire)
27 – My Father's Place, Long Island, New York
30 – Mother's, Chicago, IllinoisDecember01 – Mother's, Chicago, Illinois
02 – The Stone Toad, Milwaukee, Wisconsin (supported by Youthinesia)
04 – The Long Horn, Minneapolis, Minnesota
07 – Beginnings, Schaumburg, Illinois (supporting Pez Band)
08 – Beginnings, Schaumburg, Illinois (supporting Pez Band)
10 – The Agora, Cleveland, Ohio (with The Sports and 20/20)
11 – Bogart's, Cincinnati, Ohio (supporting The Sports)
12 – The Landmark Theatre, Syracuse New York (supporting Southside Johnny and the Asbury Jukes)
13 – The Palladium, New York City (with Bruce Woolley, Paul Collins' Beat and 20/20 (band)|20/20 – broadcast by WNEW-FM Radio)

Concerts: 1980January
18 – Goldsmith College, London
19 – The Midem Festival, Cannes (with The Inmates and Marquis de Sade)
March
16 – Pavillon Baltard, Nogent-sur-Marne, France (with Squeeze and Valerie Lagrange)
May
22 – The Venue, Victoria, London (supported by Jules and the Polar Bears)
June
10 – Dingwalls, Camden Lock, London
11 – Middlesex & Herts Country Club, Harrow, London
12 – Southbank Polytechnic, London
13 – The Half Moon, Herne Hill, London
14 – The Bridge House, Canning Town, London
21 – The Winsum Festival, Groningen, the Netherlands
July
26 – The Bridge House, Canning Town, London
27 – The Half Moon, Herne Hill, London
28 – The Marquee, Soho, London
29 – The Greyhound, London
30 – Middlesex & Herts Country Club, Harrow, London
August
17 – The Venue, Victoria, London
18 – The Zero 6 Club, Southend-on-Sea

Concerts: 1980 – The Sinceros (Hall & Oates Tour)
September
11 – Bristol Hippodrome, Bristol
12 – Southampton Gaumont, Southampton
14 – Coventry New Theatre, Coventry
15 – The Apollo, Manchester
16 – Southport Theatre, Southport
17 – Edinburgh Playhouse, Edinburgh
19 – Oxford New Theatre, Oxford
20 – Brighton Dome, Brighton
21 – Fairfield Halls, Croydon
22 – Hammersmith Odeon, Hammersmith, London
23 – Hammersmith Odeon, Hammersmith, London
24 – Birmingham Odeon, Birmingham

Radio shows: 1979
June
01 – BBC Radio One session, BBC Maida Vale Studios, London
20 – Radio One in Concert – Paris Theatre Studios, London

Radio shows: 1981
July
15 – Radio One In Concert, London

TV shows: 1980
Runaround - Southern Television

Bibliography
 Colin Larkin, The Guinness Encyclopedia of Popular Music – Page 3578, Guinness, 1995,

References

External links
 Sinceros mini-discography and liner notes
 Sinceros photo gallery
 Don Snow/Jonn Savannah
 Roni Francois' Point Studio, New South Wales, Australia

English new wave musical groups
English power pop groups
Musical groups established in 1978
Musical groups disestablished in 1981
Musical groups from London